Granddad is a 1913 American film directed by Thomas H. Ince.

Plot
Mildred lives with her grandfather, Civil War veteran Jabez Burr, who she loves deeply. One day she receives a letter from her father saying that he has remarried. Mildred's stepmother finds out that Jabez is a heavy drinker and starts to get worry about he's closeness with Mildred and soon takes a dislike to him. To avoid more frictions Jabez decided to leave. He tells his granddaughter that he is happy and working in a farm, but the truth is that he is staying at the County's Poor House.

Cast
William Desmond Taylor
Mildred Harris as Mildred
Frank Borzage

External links

1913 films
1913 drama films
American silent short films
1910s English-language films
American black-and-white films
1913 short films
Silent American drama films
Films directed by Thomas H. Ince
1910s American films